Stevenson Cottage is a historic cure cottage located at Saranac Lake, town of St. Armand in Essex County, New York.  It was built between 1865 and 1866 and is a -story, L-shaped wood-frame building on a fieldstone foundation with wood-frame siding.  Built as a residence, it was later adapted for use as a cure cottage.  Author Robert Louis Stevenson and his family occupied the west wing of the house from October 1887 to April 1888 while he was recovering from a lung ailment. The house was purchased in the 1920s by the Stevenson Society of America, which continues to operate it as a museum of the author's memorabilia.

It was listed on the National Register of Historic Places in 1992.

References

External links
Stevenson Society of America Inc. website

Houses on the National Register of Historic Places in New York (state)
Historic house museums in New York (state)
Houses completed in 1866
Literary museums in the United States
Biographical museums in New York (state)
Museums in Essex County, New York
Houses in Essex County, New York
1866 establishments in New York (state)
National Register of Historic Places in Essex County, New York